Mark Greene, M.D. is a fictional character from the American medical drama series ER, portrayed by actor Anthony Edwards. He first appears in the series' pilot episode, and subsequently appeared as one of the principal characters until the end of the eighth season. Edwards later returned to make a guest appearance in the fifteenth season episode "Heal Thyself".

Considered to be the lead protagonist of the series’ first eight seasons, Greene's role was that of a mediator and occasional authority figure. He begins the series as the ER's chief resident, before being promoted to an attending physician. He became the only member of the original set of main characters that died during the series.

Character background

Mark Greene, an only child, was raised by his mother, Ruth (portrayed by Bonnie Bartlett), and father, David (portrayed by John Cullum). David Greene served in the United States Navy, and thus the family moved frequently and lived all over the country, including: Jacksonville, Florida, Norfolk, Virginia, Corpus Christi, Texas, Washington D.C., Kings Bay, Georgia, and Hawaii, where they spent three years, David's longest assignment. Greene had a very strained relationship with his father, and was decidedly closer to his mother. Greene would often act out in an attempt to upset his father and aimed his goals in the opposite of what his father wanted. Mark thought his father's Navy career mattered more to him than his family, only to later learn that David was on track to be an admiral and turned down the chance in order to come home and help Mark deal with a bully. The most memorable time of his childhood was when his family was in Hawaii, a time he would later recreate with daughter Rachel during the last few weeks of his life.

While still in high school, Greene met and soon after developed a romantic relationship with Jennifer (Jen). Presumably, their relationship lasted the duration of their time in college, and at some point around the time Greene was at medical school, he married Jennifer. His daughter Rachel was born shortly afterward. While in medical school, he met future colleague Doug Ross. Greene then completed his internship and residency in the Emergency Department of County General Hospital in Chicago, Illinois, and from there he was awarded the position of Chief Resident of the Emergency Department. While there, Greene developed close friendships with Dr. Susan Lewis, an ER-resident, and nurse manager, Carol Hathaway, as well as continuing his close friendship with Doug Ross, now a pediatrician. Although Greene enjoys working the ER, his marriage has been strained by the many nights on call, the long hours, and his wife Jen's decision to complete law school.

History 
In the pilot episode, which takes place on St. Patrick's Day 1994, Dr. Greene, the chief resident, is awakened in the first scene to help his long-time friend Doug, the emergency pediatric fellow who often comes in to sober up on his nights off. Also, his close friendship with Susan is shown as they confide in each other about their personal lives while on break.

During the same episode, Jen gets Mark to visit a private practice near the hospital to explore the possibility of leaving his job at the ER and getting more family-friendly hours. Greene decides the "clean" medicine isn't his cup of tea. Back at the ER, Greene removes a hangnail from an older woman, who wanted him to remove it despite the fact she'd be charged $180. Later during the night, Greene has to urge everyone to get back to work when Carol is rushed into the ER after a shocking suicide attempt.

During the first season, Dr. Greene's marriage becomes increasingly shaky. When offered an attending physician's position by David Morgenstern, Greene readily accepts, much to Jen's chagrin. As a newly admitted member of the bar, Jen has been clerking for a judge in Milwaukee, and becomes increasingly tired of commuting and living separately to accommodate Greene's job. She begins an affair with a coworker, and the marriage soon ends, with Rachel and Jen leaving Chicago first for Milwaukee and later for St. Louis.

In "Love's Labor Lost", Greene makes miscalculations in treating a pregnant woman that leads to her death in childbirth, and the after-effects of this case linger long into Season 2.

In "A Miracle Happens Here", a Christmas episode, Greene explains that he is the son of an agnostic Jew and a lapsed Catholic. He lights a Hanukkah candle for a Holocaust survivor. Greene understands some Yiddish.

Greene's career becomes more difficult as he needs to make decisions that periodically alienate his friends, such as selecting Dr. Kerry Weaver for Chief Resident over another applicant, angering Susan Lewis as the other applicant is a good friend of hers and she dislikes Weaver's harsh attitude. Greene's friendship with Dr. Ross becomes strained as his administrative tasks often put him at odds with Doug's wild ways and he is disgusted by Doug's personal problems to the point where he briefly overrules and belittles Doug's abilities as a physician before reconciling with his friend.

His love life takes another downward spin when his feelings for Dr. Lewis increase, but she leaves the hospital for a job in Phoenix, Arizona. He suffers emotionally again after he is brutally beaten in the ER men's room in the episode "Random Acts". The attack is initially believed to have been carried out by Chris Law in retaliation to avenge the death of his brother, who had been treated by Dr. Greene for a gunshot wound. Law claims Dr. Greene failed to save his brother’s life because of his race, as Greene had assumed he and his brother were gangbangers. Later, it is implied that his assailant was a psychotic individual who was randomly attacking doctors. The real assailant is never caught.

After the attack in Season 3, Greene buys a gun and, in an extremely uncharacteristic moment, pulls the gun on a group of teenagers who were harassing and following him on a train platform; soon after he throws it in the river. He struggles through a large part of Season 4 but comes to terms with his attack in Season 5 when he helps Nigerian-born janitor Mobilage Ekabo reveal his memories of torture by talking about the attack with him, allowing him to obtain political asylum and avoid deportation.

With the passing of Doug's father comes the re-entrance of Mark's parents. He and Doug travel to California to settle Doug's father's affairs (Doug's father and new wife were both killed in a car wreck) and take a side trip to visit Mark's parents, who live in another part of California. His relationship with his father David is still strained, and his mother suffers from a string of medical conditions associated with aging. Mark also finds out that his mother viewed his birth as a mistake, as she didn't know his father well and got married quickly when she got pregnant. Mark's distrust of the Navy puts him at odds with David when he and Mark fight over whether Ruth should be treated in a base hospital or a civilian hospital. Ruth eventually dies and Mark goes to her funeral, leaving him on edge when he clashes with Kerry Weaver over Robert Romano's successful drive for the chief of staff position.

Greene's personal life after his marriage ends is tumultuous. He follows in Doug's playboy footsteps, having several flings and an affair with Nurse Chuny Marquez, and setting up three dates in one day. He has a brief relationship with a needy desk clerk, Cynthia Hooper (played by Mariska Hargitay in season 4). Hooper leaves him after she finds out Greene doesn't really love her. Greene eventually meets British surgeon, Elizabeth Corday. Corday is in Chicago on an exchange program, under the guidance of Dr. Romano. Romano's advances on Corday fail, as does her relationship with Peter Benton. Eventually, Greene and Elizabeth begin dating in Season 5, finally forming a stable and happy relationship.

During Season 6, Greene discovers that his father is suffering from advanced lung cancer. After David realizes that he can no longer live alone, he moves to Chicago and stays with Mark.  After an awkward first meeting, he warms up to Elizabeth very quickly. Father and son reach an emotional bonding that heals the difficult relationship from Mark's youth, and David eventually succumbs to his cancer.

Mark and Elizabeth begin a more serious relationship and move in together. Greene later buys a house, and he and Elizabeth get married and have a daughter, Ella. Their happiness is threatened, though, when the abusive father of a patient goes on a killing rampage after losing his son to social workers. In a bid to get his son back, he kills and injures a number of people and attempts to go after Elizabeth and Ella.

After being shot by an armed bystander, he is brought to the ER. During his treatment, Greene takes him aboard an elevator to go to an operating room. The patient goes into cardiac arrest when alone in the elevator with Greene, who withholds defibrillation and allows him to go into ventricular fibrillation and die. He later falsifies records to show that he did attempt to save the patient. Elizabeth suspects what Mark did but lets the matter drop.

Later, Rachel appears in Chicago unannounced, citing arguments with her mother, and moves in with Mark and a very reluctant Elizabeth. Rachel's reckless behavior and drug use lead to Ella, still, an infant, overdosing in season 8, putting a heavy strain on Mark and Elizabeth's marriage.

Character death
While suturing a patient's wound, Greene loses control of his faculties and is temporarily unable to speak. After a CT scan and a biopsy, he is diagnosed with an aggressive form of brain cancer, glioblastoma multiforme, that is thought to be inoperable. Embarrassed, Greene briefly tries to hide his condition, but his cover is blown when he has a seizure while arguing with Carter.

With little time, Greene seeks a second opinion from an eminent New York City neurosurgeon, Dr. Burke. Greene is told that the tumor is near a critical section of his brain but hasn't "invaded" it yet and they can perform an operation on New Year's Eve 2000. Greene's surgery is performed by Burke and things appear to be positive, although it takes him a while to return to his old self. A year or so later, however, Greene finds out his tumor has returned, and Dr. Burke both confirms this and says he cannot operate again because the tumor regrowth is now in part of his brain where an operation would render Greene completely vegetative.  While chemo treatment will only allow Greene to live for another 5–6 months, Burke points out: "You should have been dead a year ago, Mark.  You got married, saw your daughter be born - I'd say that was time well spent."

At this point, Rachel has run away from Jen in St. Louis and is staying with Mark and Elizabeth.  Though she vehemently denies it, her recreational drug use becomes apparent when her baby sister Ella gets hold of some ecstasy in her backpack and nearly dies after ingesting it in the episode "Damage is Done".

When Rachel shows up, Mark can barely control his anger at her, berating her for repeatedly lying to him and for putting Ella in danger. However, he sees her remorse and fear for Ella are genuine; knowing Elizabeth is angry enough for both of them, he hugs Rachel when she starts to cry. When Mark refuses to throw Rachel out of the house, Elizabeth says she won't return home with Ella as long as Rachel is there and leaves home with Ella and moves into a hotel. Unwilling to tell Elizabeth about his condition, Mark stays with Susan during the course of his chemotherapy and radiation treatments. Elizabeth later finds out the truth and wants to come home, but Mark tells her she shouldn't pretend to be his wife just because he's sick; however, she returns anyway and begins helping Mark as his terminal illness advances. Mark suffers more medical problems and his time in the ER comes to an end.

Eventually, however, he resigns himself to his fate and decides to halt the debilitating chemo, deciding he would rather have three good final months than twice that suffering from his treatments.

On his last day in the ER, he meets with the same older woman that viewers saw on the first episode of ER. She again has a hangnail and complains about how painful it is. Greene tells her that he has an inoperable tumor, asks another doctor to treat her, and tells the patient not to return to the ER again. He leaves the ER, stops his chemotherapy treatments, tells John Carter that he will now "set the tone" and takes Rachel on a last-minute trip to Hawaii to rebuild his relationship with her and relive happier times.

After several moves around the island and some conflict with a surly Rachel, Mark suffers from increased symptoms, including a seizure while walking with Rachel, prompting her to call Elizabeth, who comes to Hawaii with Ella. One night, Rachel comes to her father's room while he sleeps. Mark awakens and smiles at Rachel, telling her with slurred speech that he was just dreaming of her and how she used to love balloons. He tells her that he was trying to think of a piece of advice that every father should tell his daughter, and tells her to be generous with her time, her love, and her life. Rachel tells her father that she remembers a lullaby that Mark used to sing her when she was a baby and slips a pair of headphones on his head and plays Israel Kamakawiwo'ole's rendition of "Over The Rainbow" for him as he smiles and falls back asleep. While the song plays, he is seen walking through an empty ER. The next morning, Elizabeth discovers that he has died.

In the episode "The Letter", Carter discovers two faxes that had arrived earlier, both sent by Elizabeth. He reads the first one to the staff. It is a letter that Greene had written about his sentiments about the Chicago County ER where he had worked for many years, and the staff he had worked with throughout the years. They begin happily discussing his letter until Lewis notices that Carter is holding the second fax, visibly upset. He informs them that the second is a brief letter written by Elizabeth, notifying them that Mark had died that morning around 6 A.M., "… at sunrise, his favorite time of the day."

She explains that she sent the first letter to show the staff at the ER what he thought of them. As the staff responds sadly to this news, Frank asks if he should post the second fax on the staff bulletin board, and Carter tells him to post both of them. The letter and the news of his passing send many of the ER's staff that day into emotional turmoil, with Kerry Weaver going from second-guessing Abby's posting of the letter (she quickly changes her mind and says it should stay up) to crying and stating her regrets to Sandy Lopez that she's lost a friend. This portion of the episode closely models the scene at the end of the film Mister Roberts, when Jack Lemmon's character, Ensign Pulver, reads two similar letters connected with the title character's death. It was also revealed in the episode by Susan Lewis that he died at the age of 38, making his birth year-end 1963 or 1964.

At the close of the episode, as the staff rush out to the ambulance bay to handle incoming casualties, the wind blowing through the open door tears one page of Greene's letter off of the bulletin board.

Greene's body is returned to Chicago, where he is buried. Many of his friends and colleagues come to the funeral: John Carter, Peter Benton, Kerry Weaver, Abby Lockhart, Luka Kovač, Susan Lewis, Jing-Mei Chen, Robert Romano, Jerry Markovic, Lydia Wright, Frank Martin, Donald Anspaugh, William "Wild Willy" Swift (played by Michael Ironside in 1994), Haleh Adams, Michael Gallant, Cleo Finch, Jen, Rachel, Ella, and Elizabeth.

After the funeral, Rachel asks Elizabeth if she can visit to see Ella; Elizabeth responds "Of course, she's your sister." Rachel then suddenly asks the driver to pull over: she walks to a bunch of balloons attached to a fence, takes a purple one, and slowly lets go of it, watching it rise toward the sky.

Rachel goes back to living with her mother in St. Louis but later returns to Chicago when the time comes to select a college, as well as asking a bemused Elizabeth to help her acquire effective birth control pills.

In the April 2009 ER series finale, she returns to County General to interview for a spot as a med student, showing that she has become a responsible young woman and followed in Mark's footsteps.

Epilogue
It was reported that Dr. Mark Greene was written out of the series because actor Anthony Edwards had decided that he wanted to move on to other opportunities and spend time with his family.

In season 9, episode 2, Elizabeth Corday is grieving his death. She becomes emotional when she enters the doctors' lounge and sees a photograph of him smiling with some of the hospital staff before his death. Greene was also shown in an old Christmas photo in Season 10's "Freefall," alongside Abby and Drs. Lewis, Carter, and Kovac. He appears in photos included in the slideshow shown at Dr. Carter's farewell party in the Season 11 episode "The Show Must Go On".

Greene was also heard in a voice-over telling Carter that he needed to "set the tone" in the ER (as Dr. Morgenstern told Dr. Greene in the pilot episode).

In the Season 12 episode "Body and Soul," he is mentioned during a flashback to 2002, when Dr. Pratt tells patient Nate Lennox (James Woods) that the reason the ER has few staff working is because they are at Greene's funeral.

In Season 14's "Blackout," Nurse Chuny Marquez expresses incredulity that the ER will be led by young physicians Dr. Pratt and Dr. Morris, versus Dr. Greene and Dr. Ross. Nurse Samantha Taggart, who only started working at County General after Dr. Greene's and Dr. Ross's tenures, asks, poignantly, "Who?"

Return to the series 
In 2008, ER producers announced that Edwards would reprise his role for the series' final season, with Dr. Greene appearing in flashbacks in the episode "Heal Thyself" shedding light on Dr. Catherine Banfield's (played by Angela Bassett) past.

On November 13, 2008, over six years after his exit from the show, Anthony Edwards returned as Dr. Mark Greene. The flashback episode took place in 2002, just months before Greene's death, and revealed an encounter he had with Catherine Banfield, six years before she began working in that same emergency room. He was treating Banfield's son Darryl who had a debilitating disease that turned out to be leukemia. The story appeared to take place at the point in Season 8 when Mark and Elizabeth were reconciling after she learned his tumor had recurred. Greene takes on the mysterious case to save the 5-year-old. He has a run-in with Kerry Weaver and Robert Romano about putting this case ahead of his chemo treatment which took a toll on him throughout that day. Darryl dies in the ER but it was Greene's heroic actions that triggered Catherine in the present day to help save a young girl from drowning and may have also inspired her to work full-time at County. During their encounter, Cate kept pressing Greene, who told her to stop being a doctor and to start being a mother. Cate gave the same advice to the young girl's mother.

In the season 15 episode The Book of Abby, long-serving nurse Haleh Adams shows the departing Abby Lockhart a closet wall where all the past doctors and employees have put their locker name tags. Among them, the tag "Greene" can be seen.

References

ER (TV series) characters
Fictional physicians
Television characters introduced in 1994
Fictional American Jews
Fictional characters with cancer